Sefteh may refer to:
 Sefteh, Bezenjan, a village in Baft County
 Sefteh, Fathabad, a village in Baft County
 Sefteh, Khabar, a village in Baft County
 Sefteh, Bardsir
 Sefteh, Golzar, a village in Bardsir County